Oddjobs was an American hip hop group from Minnesota. It consisted of Advizer, Crescent Moon, Nomi, Anatomy, and Deetalx.  After the breakup of Oddjobs, the members of the group except Deetalx reformed as Kill the Vultures.

History
Oddjobs released the album, Drums, in 2001. The 12-inch single, "Blue Collar Holler", reached number 6 on the CMJ college radio hip hop chart in 2002. The six-track EP, The Shopkeeper's Wife, was released in 2003. The group toured with DJ Shadow in the same year.

Members
 Advizer (Adam Waytz) - rapper
 Crescent Moon (Alexei Casselle) - rapper
 Nomi (Mario Demira) - rapper
 Anatomy (Stephen Lewis) - producer/DJ
 Deetalx (Devon Callahan) - producer/DJ

Discography

Studio albums
 Conflict and Compromise (1999)
 Drums (2002)
 Expose Negative (2005)

Live albums
 Live! at the Bryant-Lake Bowl, 17–18 August 2001 (2001) with Typical Cats and Heiruspecs

EPs
 Absorbing Playtime (2000)
 Fun Boy (2003)
 The Shopkeeper's Wife (2003)

Singles
 "Dry Bones" (2002)
 "Blue Collar Holler" (2002)

Guest appearances
 Sixth Sense - "Laws of Gravity" from Grand's Sixth Sense (2011)

References

External links
 

Alternative hip hop groups
Musical groups from Minnesota
Musical quintets
South High School (Minnesota) alumni